Simon H. Johnson (born January 16, 1963) is a British American economist. He is the Ronald A. Kurtz Professor of Entrepreneurship at the MIT Sloan School of Management and a senior fellow at the Peterson Institute for International Economics. He has held a wide variety of academic and policy-related positions, including Professor of Economics at Duke University's Fuqua School of Business. From March 2007 through the end of August 2008, he was Chief Economist of the International Monetary Fund.

He is the author of the 2010 book 13 Bankers: The Wall Street Takeover and the Next Financial Meltdown, along with James Kwak, with whom he has also co-founded and regularly contributes to the economics blog The Baseline Scenario.

Education
Johnson's first degree was a BA from the University of Oxford, which was followed by an MA from the University of Manchester, and finally in 1989 he earned a Ph.D. in economics from MIT, with a dissertation entitled Inflation, intermediation, and economic activity.

Career
In November 2020, Johnson was named a volunteer member of the Joe Biden presidential transition Agency Review Team to support transition efforts related to the United States Department of Treasury and the Federal Reserve.

Affiliations
Among other positions he is a research associate at the National Bureau of Economic Research, a research fellow at the Centre for Economic Policy Research, and a member of the International Advisory Council at the Center for Social and Economic Research (CASE). He is also a member of the Congressional Budget Office's Panel of Economic Advisers. From 2006 to 2007 he was a visiting fellow at the Peterson Institute for International Economics, where he is currently a senior fellow. He is on the editorial board of four academic economics journals. He has contributed to Project Syndicate since 2007.

See also
 Brown–Kaufman amendment

Notes

Further reading 
 Johnson, Simon, "The Quiet Coup", Atlantic Monthly, May 2009

External links
 Faculty profile at MIT
 Johnson's co-blog at MIT
 Profile at the International Monetary Fund
 Column archive at Project Syndicate
 CV of Simon Johnson at the Center for Social and Economic Research (CASE)
 
 
 Video (with audio-only available) of conversation with Johnson about economic issues on Bloggingheads.tv
 Simon Johnson's economics blog "Baseline Scenario"
 Interview with BBC Peter Day's World of Business – Podcast
 MIT video presentation of "13 Bankers: The Wall Street Takeover and the Next Financial Meltdown"
 April 16 2010 appearance on Bill Moyer's Journal, joined by colleague James Kwak
 

1963 births
20th-century American economists
21st-century American economists
Alumni of the University of Manchester
Alumni of the University of Oxford
British economists
British emigrants to the United States
Duke University faculty
Institute for New Economic Thinking
Living people
MIT School of Humanities, Arts, and Social Sciences alumni
MIT Sloan School of Management faculty
Peterson Institute for International Economics
Place of birth missing (living people)